Property Specification Language (PSL) is a temporal logic extending linear temporal logic with a range of operators for both ease of expression and enhancement of expressive power. PSL makes an extensive use of regular expressions and syntactic sugaring. It is widely used in the hardware design and verification industry, where formal verification tools (such as model checking) and/or  logic simulation tools are used to prove or refute that a given PSL formula holds on a given design.

PSL was initially developed by Accellera for specifying properties or assertions about hardware designs. Since September 2004 the standardization on the language has been done in IEEE 1850 working group. In September 2005, the IEEE 1850 Standard for Property Specification Language (PSL) was announced.

Syntax and semantics 

PSL can express that if some scenario happens now, then another scenario should happen some time later. For instance, the property "a   should always eventually be ed" can be expressed by the PSL formula: 
  always (request -> eventually! grant) 

The property "every   that is immediately followed by an  signal, should be followed by a complete  , where a complete data transfer is a sequence starting with signal , ending with  signal  in which  holds at the meantime" can be expressed by the PSL formula: 
  (true[*]; req; ack)  |=> (start; busy[*]; end) 
A trace satisfying this formula is given in the figure on the right.

PSL's temporal operators can be roughly classified into LTL-style operators and regular-expression-style operators. Many PSL operators come in two versions, a strong version, indicated by an exclamation mark suffix, and a weak version. The strong version makes eventuality requirements (i.e. require that something will hold in the future), while the weak version does not. An underscore suffix is used to differentiate inclusive vs. non-inclusive requirements. The   and  suffixes are used to denote universal (all) vs. existential (exists) requirements.

SERE-style operators

Its left operand is a PSL regular expression and its right operand is any PSL formula (be it in LTL style or regular expression style). This is exemplified in the figures on the right.

The trigger operator comes in several variations, shown in the table below.

 

Operators for concatenation, fusion, union, intersection and their variations are shown in the table below.

Operators for consecutive repetitions are shown in the table below.

Here  is a PSL regular expression. 

Operators for non-consecutive repetitions are shown in the table below.

Here  is any PSL Boolean expression.

LTL-style operators

Below is a sample of some LTL-style operators of PSL.

Sampling operator

Sometimes it is desirable to change the definition of the next time-point, for instance in multiply-clocked designs, or when a higher level of abstraction is desired. The sampling operator  (also known as the clock operator), denoted , is used for this purpose. The formula  where   is a PSL formula and   a PSL Boolean expressions holds on a given path if   on that path projected on the cycles in which   holds, as exemplified in the figures to the right. 

The first property states that "every   that is immediately followed by an    signal, should be followed by a complete  , where a complete data transfer is a sequence starting with signal , ending with  signal  in which   should hold at least 8 times: 
  (true[*]; req; ack)  |=> (start; data[=8]; end) 
But sometimes it is desired to consider only the cases where the above signals occur on a cycle where  is high. 
This is depicted in the second figure in which although the formula 
  ((true[*]; req; ack)  |=> (start; data[*3]; end)) @ clk 

The semantics of formulas with nested @ is a little subtle. The interested reader is referred to [2].

Abort operators 

PSL has several operators to deal with truncated paths (finite paths that may correspond to a prefix of the computation). Truncated paths occur in bounded-model checking, due to resets and in many other scenarios. The abort operators, specify how eventualities should be dealt with when a path has been truncated. They rely on the truncated semantics proposed in [1].

Expressive power
PSL subsumes the temporal logic LTL and extends its expressive power to that of the omega-regular languages.  The augmentation in expressive power, compared to that of LTL, which has the expressive power of the star-free ω-regular expressions, can be attributed to the suffix implication, also known as the triggers operator, denoted "|->". The formula r |-> f where r is a regular expression and f is a temporal logic formula holds on a computation w if any prefix of w matching r has a continuation satisfying f. Other non-LTL operators of PSL are the @ operator, for specifying multiply-clocked designs, the abort operators, for dealing with hardware resets, and local variables for succinctness.

Layers
PSL is defined in 4 layers: the Boolean layer, the temporal layer, the modeling layer and the verification layer.
The Boolean layer is used for describing a current state of the design and is phrased using one of the above-mentioned HDLs.
The temporal layer consists of the temporal operators used to describe scenarios that span over time (possibly over an unbounded number of time units).
The modeling layer can be used to describe auxiliary state machines in a procedural manner.
The verification layer consists of directives to a verification tool (for instance to assert that a given property is correct or to assume that a certain set of properties is correct when verifying another set of  properties).

Language compatibility
Property Specification Language can be used with multiple electronic system design languages (HDLs) such as:
 VHDL (IEEE 1076)
 Verilog (IEEE 1364)
 SystemVerilog (IEEE 1800)
 SystemC (IEEE 1666) by Open SystemC Initiative (OSCI).
When PSL is used in conjunction with one of the above HDLs, its Boolean layer uses the operators of the respective HDL.

References

IEC 62531:2007 

IEC 62531:2012

External links
 IEEE 1850 working group
 IEEE Announcement September 2005
 Accellera
 Property Specification Language Tutorial
 Designers guide to PSL

Books on PSL
 Using PSL/Sugar for Formal and Dynamic Verification 2nd Edition, Ben Cohen, Ajeetha Kumari, Srinivasan Venkataramanan
 A Practical Introduction to PSL, Cindy Eisner, Dana Fisman

Hardware verification languages
Formal specification languages
IEEE DASC standards
IEC standards